Philo Judson Farnsworth (9 January 1830, in Westford, Vermont – 14 February 1909, in Clinton, Iowa) was a United States physician who worked in Iowa.

He graduated from the University of Vermont in 1854, and at its medical department in 1858. He practised at Philipsburg, Canada, until 1860, in which year he received a second medical degree from the New York College of Physicians and Surgeons. He was in Lyons, Iowa, in 1862-66, then went to Clinton, Iowa, and in 1870 was elected to the chair of materia medica and diseases of children in the University of Iowa.

He was a member of several medical societies, and has contributed frequently to professional journals, chiefly to the Medical and Surgical Reporter of Philadelphia. He has also paid some attention to local geology and archaeology. He read a paper on the “Therapeutics of Ammonia” before the American Medical Association in 1873, and one on “Indian Mounds” before the Iowa National History Society in 1876. He is the author of A Synopsis of a Course of Lectures on Materia Medica (Chicago, 1884).

References
 

Attribution

1832 births
1909 deaths
Physicians from Iowa
University of Iowa faculty
University of Vermont alumni
People from Westford, Vermont
New York College of Physicians and Surgeons alumni